The 2019–20 season was Carlisle United's 115th season in their history and their sixth consecutive season in League Two. Along with League Two, the club also participated in the FA Cup, EFL Cup and EFL Trophy.

The season covered the period from 1 July 2019 to 30 June 2020.

Squad statistics

Top scorers

Up

Disciplinary record

Notes:

Pre-season
On 15 June 2019, The Cumbrians announced their pre-season schedule.

Competitions

League Two

League table

Results summary

Results by matchday

Matches
On Thursday, 20 June 2019, the EFL League Two fixtures were revealed.

FA Cup

The first round draw was made on 21 October 2019. The second round draw was made live on 11 November from Chichester City's stadium, Oaklands Park. The third round draw was made live on BBC Two from Etihad Stadium, where Micah Richards and Tony Adams conducted the draw.

EFL Cup

The first round draw was made on 20 June. The second round draw was made on 13 August 2019 following the conclusion of all but one first round matches.

EFL Trophy

On 9 July 2019, the pre-determined group stage draw was announced with Invited clubs to be drawn on 12 July 2019.

Carlisle United eliminated from EFL Trophy

Transfers

Transfers in

Loans in

Loans out

Transfers out

References

Carlisle United F.C. seasons
Carlisle United